Pochtovy was a submarine built for the Imperial Russian Navy. The boat was designed by Drzewiecki and built at the Metal Works St Petersburg in 1908. She was funded by Public subscription.

This ship's machinery was a novel attempt at Air Independent Propulsion (AIP) using gasoline engines with air supplied by pressurised cylinders. Forty-five cylinders containing  of air at 2500 psi could give the boat a  submerged range on one engine. The exhaust gases were vented via perforated pipe under the keel. The system proved reliable in trials but condensation problems and the tell-tale wake produced by the exhaust resulted in no further development and the boat was stricken in 1913.

References

Submarines of the Imperial Russian Navy
Ships built in Russia
1908 ships
Experimental submarines